HMS Newcastle was a wooden screw frigate, the fifth ship of the name to serve in the Royal Navy.

Notes

References

Lyon, David & Winfield, Rif: The Sail and Steam Navy List: All the Ships of the Royal Navy 1815–1889 Chatham Publishing, 2004. .

Frigates of the Royal Navy
Ships built in Deptford
Victorian-era frigates of the United Kingdom
1860 ships